Whatever Happened to Vileness Fats? is the soundtrack to the 1984 video of the same name by the American art rock group the Residents.

Track listing

 Track 6, "Broccoli and Saxophone", is split into 2 tracks on the 1991 CD edition, the second track being "Eloise".

1991 CD bonus tracks 
Tracks 12-20 are taken from the 1984 soundtrack to The Census Taker.

References

The Residents soundtracks
1984 soundtrack albums
Musical film soundtracks